Sabrina Grigorian (1956–1986) was an Italian-born Armenian actress.

Life and career
Sabrina Grigorian was born in Rome, Italy on July 28, 1956 to artist Marcos Grigorian and Flora Adamian. After the divorce of her parents, Sabrina was brought up by her father and Sabrina acquired primary schooling in Tehran at a special school for talented children. She then later attended high school at New York City. Coming back to Tehran she met Patricia Zich, Theater Director at the Community School, and also director of The Masquers, an international theater organization of young adults in Tehran. Zich recognized Sabrina's extraordinary artistic talent.

After graduating from high school Sabrina went to London, auditioned and was admitted to the Guildhall School of Music and Drama to study acting. During those years Sabrina traveled extensively. She went to United States, to Switzerland, Spain, Italy and many other places absorbing all the knowledge she could. She was fluent in Armenian, English, French, was familiar with Persian, Italian, Spanish. As a student Sabrina played a dozen different roles ranging from supporting to Leading ones in Tehran and at Guildhall. During her training as an actress in Tehran and later at the Guildhall School of Music and Drama, Sabrina played Rosa Gonzalez in Tennessee Williams "Summer and Smoke", Hippolyta in Shakespeare's "A Midsummer Night's Dream" and Emilia in "Othello", Masha in Anton Chekhov's  "The Three Sisters", Dina in Ibsen's "The Pillar of the Community", Belvidera in Thomas Ottoway's "Venice Preserved", the Dark Lady in George Bernard Shaw's "The Dark Lady of the Sonnets", Margot in Frances H. Goodrich's "Anne Frank: The Diary of a Young Girl", Corie in Neil Simon's "Barefoot in the Park", Mrs. Martin in Eugene Ionesco's "The Bald Soprano" and Medea in Robinson Jeffers' Adaptation of the Euripides' play.

During her short lifetime on the stage Sabrina portrayed, created such  impressive characters that her audience and her teachers and directors were filled with admiration.

For three years, Sabrina was editorial and research assistant to Gene Shalit, the director of the "Today" show at NBC. While working at New York City, she wrote several theatrical and musical commentaries and articles which were published in Delta Sky Magazine, Ladies Home Journal, Diversion Magazine and other periodicals. She also prepared scripts for "on-air" viewing.

She died on July 10, 1986 of a heart attack, and is buried in Cedar Grove Cemetery in Flushing, Queens, New York City.

References

External links
 Gevorg Abajyan "Sabrina Grigorian", Publisher:	Yerevan, Armenia : Near East Museum, 2000

1956 births
Actresses from Tehran
Italian expatriates in Iran
Italian emigrants to the United States
American people of Armenian descent
American actresses
Italian people of Armenian descent
1986 deaths
Ethnic Armenian actresses
20th-century American women